The 2018–19 season was the 122nd season of competitive football by Heart of Midlothian (Hearts) with the team participating in the Scottish Premiership. Hearts are playing their fourth consecutive season in the top tier of Scottish football, having been promoted from the Scottish Championship at the end of the 2014–15 season. They reached the Semi-final of the Scottish League Cup and reached the Final of the Scottish Cup.

Results and fixtures

Friendlies
Hearts will return for pre-season training on 21 June, with the first preseason friendly scheduled to take place against Arbroath at the start of July. Further preseason friendlies are scheduled to take place against Dumbarton, Partick Thistle, Queen of the South and Forfar Athletic. A scheduled trip to Germany for a training camp was cancelled.

During the winter break Hearts travelled to Murcia for a five-day training camp. Whilst in Spain they are scheduled to play a bounce game against Lokeren.

Premiership

The Scottish Premiership fixture list was announced on 15 June 2018. Hearts began the season with a 4–1 away victory against Hamilton Academical at New Douglas Park.

League Cup
Having not qualified for Europe Hearts entered the League Cup at the group stages. On 25 May, Hearts were drawn in Group C, alongside Cove Rangers, Cowdenbeath, Inverness Caledonian Thistle and Raith Rovers. On 18 July 2018, Hearts played Cove Rangers, which marked the first competitive match at Balmoral Stadium.  Olly Lee opened the scoring after 11 minutes, before fellow debutante Steven MacLean doubled the advantage in the second half. Cove pulled one back via Paul McManus with 15 minutes remaining, but were unable to equalise. During the 65th minute of the match Andrew Irving entered the field of play, replacing Olly Lee. Irving's contract extension had not been correctly lodged with the Scottish Football Association, rendering him ineligible to play as his registration expired on 9 June. An SPFL disciplinary hearing took place on Monday 23 July, as a result of which Hearts were deducted two points from the group stages and fined £10,000, with £8,000 of the fine suspended until the end of the next season.

Hearts next group match was against Raith Rovers. Kevin Nisbet opened the scoring early in the second half for the home side, before Michael Smith equalised from 25 yards out. In the 90th minute Christophe Berra had a goal disallowed for impeding the keeper, however replays showed the foul was committed by a fellow Raith player. With the sides level at 1–1 penalties were taken, with Hearts taking the bonus point 4–2 on penalties. The group stage was wound up with two 5 – 0 wins at Tynecastle Park against Cowdenbeath and Inverness Caledonian Thistle, with goals from Steven MacLean, Uche Ikpeazu, Peter Haring, Steven Naismith, Michael Smith and Ben Garuccio. The result against Inverness meant Hearts qualified to the Second round on goal difference.

Scottish Cup
Heart of Midlothian entered the competition in the fourth round of competition as one of the sixteens teams to enter in this round of the competition. Their first opponent was at Tynecastle Park to Premiership side Livingston where a goal from Sean Clare saw the team win the match 1–0.

In the fifth round they was drawn against Junior club Auchinleck Talbot at home who had knocked out a Championship side in the previous round. The match saw four different goal scorers with Christophe Berra scoring the opener in the tenth minute of play. Two more goals from Demetri Mitchell and Steven MacLean opened the gap to three goals before the break. A goal in the second half from Aidan Keena secured the 4–0 win but not before an injury forced them down to ten men for the final twelve minutes.

The quarter final saw the team travel to Firhill Stadium for the match against Championship side Partick Thistle. After an early goal from Christophe Berra, the team dominated the game with 59% of the possession. The tie though headed into a replay after Christie Elliott scored to level the match in the 72nd minute. The replay at Tyncastle Park saw the away team getting the opening goal in the 17th minute from a Scott McDonald tap to give the championship side the early lead. But a goal from Uche Ikpeazu and the penalty conversation from Sean Clare saw Hearts qualify for the semi-final.

For Hearts, this meant a semi final with another Championship side in Inverness in the first of two matches at Hampden Park. After a lacklustre first half, Uche Ikpeazu broke deadlock for the Hearts in the 49th minute with the shot coming off a deflection. After Jamie McCart goal was deemed offside in the 61st minute, John Souttar doubled the lead only four minutes later. Sean Clarke gave Hearts a 3–0 victory after Ikpeazu was brought down by Mark Ridgers to give a penalty which was converted.

First team player statistics

Captains
Christophe Berra continued as captain for season 2018–19, having been re-appointed as captain the previous season. Only six games into the season Berra suffered a  torn hamstring at Tynecastle against Celtic, ruling himself out for a period of around 6 months. In his absence three other players were given the opportunity to captain Hearts. Fellow defender John Souttar was initially appointed captain in his absence at the age of 21, however whilst on international duty with Scotland Souttar injured the lining of his hip and was ruled out for five months. With Berra and Souttar injured Steven Naismith took the captain's armband for the first time against Aberdeen on 20 October 2018. Naismith's stint as Captain lasted just three games, as he suffered a tear in the cartilage in his knee during the League Cup Semi-final and was ruled out for a period of six to eight weeks. This led to Peter Haring becoming the fourth player of the season to play as captain.

Berra returned as captain earlier than anticipated on 2 December versus Rangers.
{| class="wikitable" style="font-size: 95%; text-align: center;"
|-
! style="background:maroon; color:white;" scope="col" width=60|No
! style="background:maroon; color:white;" scope="col" width=60|Pos
! style="background:maroon; color:white;" scope="col" width=60|Country
! style="background:maroon; color:white;" scope="col" width=150|Name
! style="background:maroon; color:white;" scope="col" width=80|No of games
! style="background:maroon; color:white;" scope="col" width=80|Notes
|-
|6||DF||||Berra||35||Captain
|-
|4||DF||||Souttar||9||Vice Captain
|-
|5||DF||||Haring||4||Vice Captain
|-
|14||FW||||Naismith||3||Vice Captain

Squad information
During the 2018–19 season, Hearts have used thirty-five players in competitive games. The table below shows the number of appearances and goals scored by each player.
Last Updated 25 May 2019
{| class="wikitable" style="font-size: 95%; text-align: center;"
|-
! style="background:maroon; color:white;" rowspan="2" width=60 | Number
! style="background:maroon; color:white;" rowspan="2" width=60 | Position
! style="background:maroon; color:white;" rowspan="2" width=60 | Nation
! style="background:maroon; color:white;" rowspan="2" width=150 | Name
! style="background:maroon; color:white;" colspan="2" | Totals
! style="background:maroon; color:white;" colspan="2" | Premiership
! style="background:maroon; color:white;" colspan="2" | League Cup
! style="background:maroon; color:white;" colspan="2" | Scottish Cup
|-
! style="background:maroon; color:white;" width=60 |Apps
! style="background:maroon; color:white;" width=60 |Goals
! style="background:maroon; color:white;" width=60 |Apps
! style="background:maroon; color:white;" width=60 |Goals
! style="background:maroon; color:white;" width=60 |Apps
! style="background:maroon; color:white;" width=60 |Goals
! style="background:maroon; color:white;" width=60 |Apps
! style="background:maroon; color:white;" width=60 |Goals
|-

 

 

  

|-
! colspan=16 style=background:#dcdcdc; text-align:center|  Players who left club during the season

 

 
Appearances (starts and substitute appearances) and goals include those in Scottish Premiership, League Cup and the Scottish Cup.

Disciplinary record
During the 2018–19 season, Hearts players have been issued with ninety-five yellow cards and five red. The table below shows the number of cards and type shown to each player. In addition striker Steven MacLean accepted a retrospective two match ban for violent conduct against Celtic's Eboue Kouassi in the League Cup. Having gone over the SFA disciplinary points threshold, Steven Naismith served a one-match ban.

A yellow card issued for simulation to Uche Ikpeazu during the game versus Aberdeen on 30 March 2019, was rescinded on appeal.
Last updated 25 May 2019

Goal scorers
Last updated 25 May 2019

Clean sheets
{| class="wikitable" style="font-size: 95%; text-align: center;"
|-
! style="background:maroon; color:white;" scope="col" width=60|
! style="background:maroon; color:white;" scope="col" width=60|
! style="background:maroon; color:white;" scope="col" width=60|
! style="background:maroon; color:white;" scope="col" width=150|Name
! style="background:maroon; color:white;" scope="col" width=90|Premiership
! style="background:maroon; color:white;" scope="col" width=90|League Cup
! style="background:maroon; color:white;" scope="col" width=90|Scottish Cup
! style="background:maroon; color:white;" scope="col" width=90|Total
|-
|1
|GK
|
|Zdenek Zlamal
|8
|3
|1
|12
|-
|2
|GK
|
|Colin Doyle
|4
|0
|2
|6
|-
! colspan=4 | Total
!12||3||3||18

Team statistics

League table

League Cup table

Division summary

Management statistics
Last updated on 25 May 2019

Home attendances
Last updated on 25 May 2019

{| class="wikitable sortable" style="text-align:center; font-size:90%"
|-
! style="background:maroon; color:white;" scope="col" width=100 | Comp
! style="background:maroon; color:white;" scope="col" width=120 | Date
! style="background:maroon; color:white;" scope="col" width=60 | Score
! style="background:maroon; color:white;" scope="col" width=250 class="unsortable" | Opponent
! style="background:maroon; color:white;" scope="col" width=150 | Attendance
|-
|League Cup||24 July 2018||bgcolor="#CCFFCC"|5–0 ||Cowdenbeath||7,486
|-
|League Cup||29 July 2018||bgcolor="#CCFFCC"|5–0 ||Inverness Caledonian Thistle||10,030
|-
|Premiership||11 August 2018||bgcolor="#CCFFCC"|1–0 ||Celtic||19,113
|-
|Premiership||1 September 2018||bgcolor="#CCFFCC"|4–1 ||St Mirren||17,714
|-
|Premiership||22 September 2018||bgcolor="#FFFFCC"|0–0 ||Livingston||17,798
|-
|League Cup||26 September 2018||bgcolor="#CCFFCC"|4–2 ||Motherwell||14,377
|-
|Premiership||29 September 2018||bgcolor="#CCFFCC"|2–1 ||St Johnstone||17,240
|-
|Premiership||20 October 2018||bgcolor="#CCFFCC"|2–1 ||Aberdeen||18,051
|-
|Premiership||31 October 2018||bgcolor="#FFFFCC"|0–0 ||Hibernian||19,410
|-
|Premiership||10 November 2018||bgcolor="#FFCCCC"|0–1 ||Kilmarnock||17,417
|-
|Premiership||2 December 2018||bgcolor="#FFCCCC"|1–2 ||Rangers||19,429
|-
|Premiership||8 December 2018||bgcolor="#CCFFCC"|1–0 ||Motherwell||15,915
|-
|Premiership||26 December 2018||bgcolor="#CCFFCC"|2–0 ||Hamilton Academical||16,475
|-
|Scottish Cup||20 January 2019||bgcolor="#CCFFCC"|1–0 ||Livingston||11,077
|-
|Premiership||23 January 2019||bgcolor="#FFCCCC"|1–2 ||Dundee||15,518
|-
|Premiership||26 January 2019||bgcolor="#CCFFCC"|2–0 ||St. Johnstone||16,672
|-
|Premiership||6 February 2019||bgcolor="#FFFFCC"|0–0 ||Livingston||15,147
|-
|Scottish Cup||10 February 2019||bgcolor="#CCFFCC"|4–0 ||Auchinleck Talbot||14,946
|-
|Premiership||23 February 2019||bgcolor="#FFFFCC"|1–1 ||St. Mirren||16,705
|-
|Premiership||27 February 2019||bgcolor="#FFCCCC"|1–2 ||Celtic||18,258
|-
|Scottish Cup||12 March 2019||bgcolor="#CCFFCC"|2–1 ||Partick Thistle||10,351
|-
|Premiership||30 March 2019||bgcolor="#CCFFCC"|2–1 ||Aberdeen||17,880
|-
|Premiership||6 April 2019||bgcolor="#FFCCCC"|1–2 ||Hibernian||19,667
|-
|Premiership||20 April 2019||bgcolor="#FFCCCC"|1–3 ||Rangers||18,212
|-
|Premiership||4 May 2019||bgcolor="#FFCCCC"|0–1 ||Kilmarnock||17,103
|-
|bgcolor="#C0C0C0"|
|bgcolor="#C0C0C0"|
|bgcolor="#C0C0C0"|
| Total attendance:
|418,663
|-
|bgcolor="#C0C0C0"|
|bgcolor="#C0C0C0"|
|bgcolor="#C0C0C0"|
| Total league attendance:
|350,396
|-
|bgcolor="#C0C0C0"|
|bgcolor="#C0C0C0"|
|bgcolor="#C0C0C0"|
| Average league attendance:
|18,441

Club

Staff

Deaths
The following players and people associated with the club died over the course of the season. Former vice chairman and director Pilmar Smith, 1956 Scottish Cup club captain Freddie Glidden and defender Tommy Darling,

International selection
Over the course of the season a number of the Hearts squad were called up on international duty. John Souttar and Steven Naismith  were called up to represent Scotland, Arnaud Djoum to represent Cameroon, Aaron Hughes, Michael Smith and Bobby Burns to represent Northern Ireland, Marcus Godinho to represent Canada, Jimmy Dunne to represent Republic of Ireland and Ben Garuccio to represent Australia.

In addition a number of the Hearts squad were called up to represent Scotland at youth level. Callumn Morrison and Jamie Brandon were called up to the under-21 squad, Morrison was also called up to the under-20 squad, Harry Cochrane and Chris Hamilton to the under-19 squad, Harry Stone, Cammy Logan, Connor Smith and Aaron Hickey to the under-17 squad and Jay Charleston-King and Leo Watson to the under-16 squad. In addition Bobby Burns was called up to represent Northern Ireland at under-21 level.

A War of Two Halves
The interactive play A War of Two Halves was presented at Tynecastle, dealing with the stories of the original 13 players who joined the 16th (Service) Battalion of the Royal Scots. It was first shown as part of the Edinburgh Festival Fringe on 27 August 2018. It ran again in the run-up to the centenary of the Armistice of 11 November 1918.

Awards
Craig Levein and the following players received Scottish Professional Football League awards over the course of the season. The club's annual award ceremony took place on 12 May 2019, with Steven Naismith winning both fans and players player of the year award. The full list of awards are included below.

SPFL awards

Club awards

Transfers

Players in

Players out

Loans in

Loans out

Contract extensions
The following players extended their contracts with the club over the course of the season.

See also
List of Heart of Midlothian F.C. seasons

Notes

References

2018-19
Scottish football clubs 2018–19 season